The Nigerian men's national under-20 football team represents Nigeria in men's international football also known as the Nigeria Under-20s or nicknamed the Flying Eagles. The Flying Eagles is the youth team for the national soccer in Nigeria. It plays a large role in the development of Nigerian football, and it’s considered to be the feeder team for the senior team. It is controlled by the Nigerian Football Federation. The team has won a record of seven African U-20 Cup of Nations titles and are also two-times runners-up of the FIFA U-20 World Cup.

Competitive record

FIFA U-20 World Cup record
 1983 - Group stage
 1985 - Third place
 1987 - Group stage
 1989 - Runners-up
 1999 - Quarter-finals
 2005 - Runners-up
 2007 - Quarter-finals
 2009 - Round of 16
 2011 - Quarter-finals
 2013 - Round of 16
 2015 - Round of 16
 2019 - Round of 16
 2023 - Qualified

Africa U-20 Cup of Nations record

A gold background colour indicates that Nigeria won the tournament.

*Draws include knockout matches decided on penalty kicks.

*There was no third place match from 1979-1989.

Team Honours and Achievements
Intercontinental
FIFA U-20 World Cup
Runners-up: 1989, 2005
Third-place: 1985

Continental
 Africa U-20 Cup of Nations
Winners: 1980, 1985, 1987, 1989, 2005, 2011, 2015 
Runners-up: 1999, 2007
Third-place: 1979, 1981, 1995, 2009, 2013, 2023
Football at the African Games
Silver medal: 2019
Sub-Continental
WAFU U-20
Silver: 2018
Quarterfinals: 2008

Staff
Head Coach: Isah Ladan Bosso
First Assistant Coach: Oladunni Oyekale
Second Assistant Coach: Atune Ali Jolomi
Scout: Samaila Marwa Keshi
Goalkeepers' Trainer: Suleiman Shuaibu

Current squad
Nigeria announced their squad of 21 players on 10 February 2023, with midfielders Musa Usman and Shatima Umar alongside forwards Kingsley James and Ayuba Abubakar being added as reserve players. On 14 February 2023, CAF confirmed the Nigeria's squad, with defender Michael Ologo being replaced by forward Ayuba Abubakar.

Head coach: Ladan Bosso

Former coaches 
 Christopher Udemezue (July 1, 1982–June 30, 1987/1988)
 Paul Hamilton (July 1, 1985–June 30, 1986)
 Olatunde Nurudeen Disu (1987–1997)
 Thijs Libregts (July 1, 1998–June 30, 1999)
 Samson Siasia (January 1, 2005–March 26, 2007; June 30, 2009)
 Ladan Basso (2007–2009)
 John Obuh (July 1, 2010–February 1, 2013)
 Emmanuel Amunike (July 1, 2014-November 1, 2017)
 Paul Aigbogun (January 1, 2019-June 30, 2020)

References

Under-20
African national under-20 association football teams
Football in Nigeria
Youth in Nigeria